Klipphausen is a municipality in the district of Meißen, in Saxony, Germany.

In today's locality Röhrsdorf, Julius Adolph Stöckhardt was born, who helped to establish agricultural chemistry in Germany, initiated the establishment of agricultural experiment stations and was a pioneer of environmental research.

Sons and daughters of the community 

 Princess Augusta Reuss of Köstritz (1822-1862), Grand Duchess of Mecklenburg
 Heinrich VII, Prince Reuss of Köstritz (1825-1906), diplomat
 Julius Adolph Stöckhardt (1809-1886), agricultural engineer
 Erhard Siedel (1895-1979), actor and theater actor
 Wulf Kirsten (born 1934), lyric poet
 Dieter Wendisch (born 1953), rower, Olympic champion 1976 and 1980

References 

Meissen (district)